Sir Neville Poole (died 1661) was an English politician who sat in the House of Commons variously between 1614 and 1648. He supported the Parliamentarian side in the English Civil War.

Poole was the son of Sir Henry Poole of Cirencester and Oaksey and his wife  Griselda Neville, daughter of Edward Nevill, 7th Baron Bergavenny. He entered Gray's Inn on 17 February 1611 and was knighted at Newmarket in January 1613.

In 1614, Poole was elected Member of Parliament for Malmesbury and was elected MP for Cricklade in 1624. He was elected MP for Cirencester in 1626. In 1636 he was High Sheriff of Wiltshire.

In April 1640, he was elected MP for Malmesbury again in the Short Parliament. He was re-elected in November 1640 for the Long Parliament and sat until he was excluded under Pride's Purge in 1648. He was Deputy Lieutenant for Wiltshire and raised a regiment for parliament in 1642.  He was involved in a parley at Marlborough in 1642 when he saw off the Royalist forces under Lord Digby prior to the Siege of Marlborough. In April 1643 he became a commissioner for sequestration. 

Poole was of Oaksey or Oxsey, Wiltshire, and was lord of the manor on South Cerney until he sold it to Sir Edward Atkyns. 

Poole married Frances Poole, daughter of Sir Henry Poole of Saperton and sister of Henry Poole. His son Edward Poole was also an MP in the Long Parliament and later at Malmesbury.

References

 
 

Year of birth missing
1661 deaths
High Sheriffs of Wiltshire
Roundheads
People from South Cerney
English barristers
English MPs 1614
English MPs 1624–1625
English MPs 1626
English MPs 1640 (April)
English MPs 1640–1648
Deputy Lieutenants of Wiltshire
Members of Parliament for Cricklade